Elections for East Lothian Council took place on Thursday 3 May 1984, alongside elections to the councils of Scotland's various other districts.

Ward results

Labour
 Musselburgh East
 Musselburgh Central
 Musselburgh South
 Musselburgh West
 Tranent North
 Tranent/Ormiston
 Carberry
 Prestonpans West
 Prestonpans East
 Gladsmuir
 Lammermuir
 Dunbar

Conservative
 Cockenzie
 Haddington
 Dirleton
 East Linton
 North Berwick

References

1984
1984 Scottish local elections
May 1984 events in the United Kingdom